Pier Gonella (born Pierangelo Gonella) is an Italian guitarist, composer, arranger, producer and founding member of the heavy metal band Mastercastle and the black metal band Necrodeath.

Biography
Pier Gonella began playing guitar at the age of 15, following his passion for such bands as Scorpions and Deep Purple. From 1993 to 1997 he studied jazz guitar in many Italian schools.  He could not finding any rock guitar teachers, so he studied rock guitar by himself. In particular he studied scores of many of his guitar heroes such as Yngwie Malmsteen, Joe Satriani, Vinnie Moore, Joey Tafolla and many others. He studied music theory and, in June 1998, received the diploma of "Teoria and Solfeggio" at the Conservatory of Music "Nicolo' Paganini" of Genoa.  He also enrolled and studied 4 years of basson.

Labyrinth
From 2003 to 2008 he played with the power metal band Labyrinth in many Italian and European festivals (such as Gods of Metal, Metalway) and, in 2005, made a 6 "gig" tour in Japan, China and Taiwan. During the tour he recorded the DVD Live in Tokyo that was included at the album Freeman, released in 2006. In March 2007 he released  the album "6 Days to Nowhere" with Labyrinth, and that same year, toured Japan again.

Necrodeath

He joined the band Necrodeath for the first time in 2006 as a guest guitarist. That year the band embarked on a 20 gig European tour supporting the band Marduk.  In 2007, Pier recorded the guitars work on the album Draculea. He left the band because he was busy with his other bands. He definitively re-joined Necrodeath in 2008. He recorded the albums Phylogenesis in 2009, Old Skull in 2010, The age of Fear in 2011, Idiosyncrasy in 2012, The 7 deadly sins in 2014.  All albums were followed by a European tour. He is still playing with this band.

Mastercastle
In 2008 Labyrinth decided to take a break. During that time Pier started a collaboration with the singer Giorgia Gueglio. They wrote many songs and sent a demo to the label Lion Music which offered them a deal. In the meantime bass player Steve Vawamas and the drum player Alessandro Bissa joined the band. They chose the name Mastercastle and released the album The Phoenix in April 2009. The album was well reviewed especially in the USA. The music video "Princess of Love" reached over 150,000 views on YouTube very quickly, and the band continued composing music. In June 2010 they released the album Last Desire and, in 2011, the album Dangerous Diamonds. Many webzine's from all over the world gave Mastercastle and their albums very good reviews and Gonella also received really good reviews as a producer of the albums.   In 2012 the band had a split with the drummer "Bix". In 2013 Gonella announced the signing of a new drummer John Macaluso (Yngwie Malmsteen, James Labrie, Ark, Tnt...). In the same year the band released the album On Fire which was produced by Gonella and mixed together with John Macaluso. In 2014 the band signed a deal for Scarlet Records and the new album Enfer was released on 14 October 2014.  Pier Gonella is still playing in this band.

Other projects

In 2001 he recorded the guitars for the album Athlantis and in 2003 he recorded the guitar and bass part for the album Wild Steel. Both were published under the label Underground Symphony. In April 2005 during his militance in Labyrinth, he published his solo album Odyssea – Tears in floods, released under the label Scarlet Records (Europe) and King Records (Japan). In 2006 Gonella appears as guest in the project Rezophonic, recording guitars for one song.  
From 2006 to 2009 Gonella plays with the big band "Metal Gang", playing hysterical heavy metal and hard rock cover featuring Pino Scotto (Vanadium), Roberto Tiranti (Labyrinth), Trevor (Sadist), Olaf Thorsen Labyrinth, Fabio Lione and many other musicians.
In the summer of 2008 Gonella was chosen as second guitar player by Timo Tolkki (Stratovarius, Revolution Renaissance) for two Italian gigs. 
In 1998 Gonella started teaching guitar lessons, working in many private schools and creating guitar clinics in the north of Italy. In 2007 he founded a recording studio for the production of his bands and for his guitar school. In 2011, it was officially opened to all with the name of MusicArt.  In 2011, together with the drummer Peso of Necrodeath and Giorgia Gueglio and Steve Vawamas of Mastercastle, he start a new project, completely rearranging and recording the famous album The Dark Side of the Moon by Pink Floyd. The project is titled The Black side of the moon and was publicized for Black Tears label.
Since 2012 Gonella has collaborated with the drummer John Macaluso for guitar and drum clinics called "Rock and Heavy Essentials" 
In the same year Pier Gonella joined the hysterical Italian metal band Vanexa.  From August 2014 Gonella collaborates with the magazine Metal Hammer Italy, writing the article Learn to play where he teach technics, licks, advice regarding electric guitar. 
On 2014 Gonella started a new "soloist" project, with Dick Laurent (Cadaveria). Here Gonella plays live many Mastercastle songs in instrumental versions, classical arrangements( Johann Sebastian Bach, Wolfgang Amadeus Mozart and others) in rock style and other unreleased material.

Discography
2001: Athlantis   (with the band Athlantis)
2003: Wild Steel   (with the band Wild Steel)
2004: Tears in floods   (with the band Odyssea)
2005: Freeman   (with the band Labyrinth)
2007: Draculea   (with the band Necrodeath)
2007: 6 days to nowhere   (with the band Labyrinth)
2008: Amazing Maze   (with the band Amazing Maze)
2009: Phylogenesis   (with the band Necrodeath)
2009: The Phoenix   (with the band Mastercastle)
2010: Old Skul   (with the band Necrodeath)
2010: Last Desire   (with the band Mastercastle)
2011: As Time Goes By...   (with the band Labyrinth)
2011: The Age of Fear   (with the band Necrodeath)
2011: Idiosyncrasy   (with the band Necrodeath)
2011: Dangerous Diamonds (with the band Mastercastle)
2012: Athlantis – M.W.N.D. (with the band Athlantis)
2012: The Black Side of the Moon (with the band MusicArt Project)
2013: Hellive (with the band Necrodeath)
2013: On Fire (with the band Mastercastle)
2014: The 7 deadly sins (with the band Necrodeath)
2014: Enfer (with the band Mastercastle)
2011: Headhunting (with the band Necrodeath)
2015: Sono animali al mondo   (with the band Verde Lauro)
2015: Storm (with the band Odyssea)
2016: Colors & Dreams (with the band MusicArt Project)
2016: Mondoscuro (with the band Cadaveria Necrodeath)
2016: Too Heavy To Fly (with the band Vanexa)
2017: Chapter 4 (with the band Athlantis)
2017: 6 aprile (with the band Verde Lauro)
2017: Wine of Heaven (with the band Mastercastle)
2018: The age of Dead christ (with the band Necrodeath)
2019: The Way of Rock 'n Roll (with the band Athlantis)
2019: Defragments of Insanity (with the band Necrodeath)
2019: Still in the Flesh (with the band Mastercastle)
2020: 02022020 (with the band Athlantis)
2020: Neraka (with the band Necrodeath)
2020: Strategy (with the band "Pier Gonella")
2021: The Last in Black (with the band "Vanexa")
2022: Lightouse Pathetic (with the band Mastercastle)

Videogames Soundtracks
Since 2008 Gonella collaborates with the Italian videogames factory called Xplored. To date Gonella has made soundtracks and sample effects for over 150 flash games.
Some examples:

Zombie in the shadow
Zombies in the Shadow-The savuoir
Toxie Radd
Toxie Radd2
Toxie Radd 3d
Dark Base2-THE HIVE
Dark Base3-Phoenix Team
Toys Vs Nightmares
X-Team
Dark Base-alien Rts
Apokalyx
Duo Blaster
EcoBears
Red Jet Rabbit
Zits-20 to die
Chili’Em All
Drow’s Fury
X-cream
Dark Base Defence
Suprb
Motel Connection
Troll revenge
Season of War
Methus'Tower Defence
Secure Mc
TacticalForce1
KinderBuenoMegaRace
Area52
Zombiestalker
Future Buggy

References

External links

A recent Pier Gonella interview
Pier Gonella Official Website
Necrodeath Official Website
Mastercastle Official Website

Italian heavy metal guitarists
Italian male guitarists
Italian rock guitarists
Lead guitarists
Italian heavy metal musicians
Living people
Year of birth missing (living people)
Place of birth missing (living people)
Italian male composers
21st-century Italian composers
21st-century Italian male musicians
Mastercastle members
Labyrinth (band) members